Really SSSupercool: Chapter Two is a 2006 Italian anthology comedy film written and directed by Carlo Vanzina and starring  Diego Abatantuono. It is the sequel of Eccezzziunale... veramente (1982).

Plot

Cast  
Diego Abatantuono as Donato Cavallo / Franco Alfano / Felice La Pezza, aka "Tirzan"
Sabrina Ferilli as Nunzia
Carlo Buccirosso as Beniamino
 Anna Maria Barbera as Ginevra
Ugo Conti as Ugo
Mauro Di Francesco as Maurino
Nino Frassica as Turi
Luigi Maria Burruano as Don Calogero Calì
Tony Sperandeo as Don Pippo Calì
 Angelo Donato Colombo as Donatello
Stefano Chiodaroli as Sandrino  
 Luis Molteni as Commendator Mambretti
 Silvia Annichiarico as The Nun 
Paolo Maldini as himself
Gennaro Gattuso as himself
Massimo Ambrosini as himself
Dida as himself
Alessandro Costacurta as himself
Andriy Shevchenko as himself
Luca Cordero di Montezemolo as himself

See also 
 List of Italian films of 2006

References

External links

2000s sports comedy films
Italian sports comedy films
Films directed by Carlo Vanzina
Italian anthology films
Italian association football films
Italian sequel films
2006 comedy films
2006 films